The Los Angeles Film Critics Association Award for Best Production Design is one of the annual film awards given by the Los Angeles Film Critics Association.

1990s

2000s

2010s

2020s

References

Los Angeles Film Critics Association Awards
Awards established in 1993